Piedipiatti (also known as Cops) is a 1991 Italian comedy film directed by Carlo Vanzina.

Plot
Italian cops investigate a drug traffic ring between Italy and Colombia. They have to find out who is the mysterious Italian criminal called “the American” who is making a deal with overseas organized crime.

Cast
Renato Pozzetto as Silvio Camurati
Enrico Montesano as Vasco Sacchetti
Anna Benny as Maria Grazia
Antonio Ballerio as Aldo Rotelli
Victor Cavallo as Sergio Proietti
Francesco De Rosa as Tarallo
Angelo Bernabucci as Angelo Bertoli
Norman Sanny as Carlos
Pino Ammendola as Chief Inspector
Mirella Falco as Signora Motta
Roberto Della Casa as Questore of Milan
Giorgio Trestini as Armando Mainardi
Terry Schiavo as Laura

References

External links

Piedipiatti at Variety Distribution

1991 films
Films directed by Carlo Vanzina
1990s Italian-language films
1991 comedy films
Italian comedy films
1990s Italian films